Admiral Perry may refer to:

Douglas G. Perry (born 1967), U.S. Navy rear admiral 
Ellis L. Perry (1919–2002), U.S. Coast Guard vice admiral
John R. Perry (1899–1955), U.S. Navy rear admiral

See also
Matthew C. Perry (1794–1858), U.S. Navy commodore (admiral-equivalent rank)
Oliver Hazard Perry (1785–1819), U.S. Navy commodore (admiral-equivalent rank)
Admiral Parry (disambiguation)